The Libyan Exchange Stock Market officially opened in Tripoli, Libya, during March 2007.

Background
The Libyan Stock Market (LSM) was established by Suliman Alshahmy by Decision No. (134) of the General People's Committee (GPCO), on June 3, 2006, to form a joint stock company with capital of 20 million Libyan dinars, divided into 2 million shares with a nominal value of 10 LD per share. The first phase focused on introducing financial definitions and rules, the addition of several workshop courses, and a series of agreements with the Amman Stock Exchange and Cairo & Alexandria Stock Exchange and the Egyptian Company for Clearance and deposit.

Listed market securities include the National Mills and Fodder Company, the United Insurance Company, Bank of deserts, and the Libyan Insurance Company, Sahari Bank, and the Hay Alandalus Domestic Bank. The volume of subscription on July 2, 2007, totalled 49539 shares, with a total value amounting to 346.773 LD.

"LIBYA 18 October 2007. A cooperation agreement was signed on Monday in London between the Libyan Stock Exchange Market and London Stock Exchange."

The agreement was signed by the Chairman of Administration and General Director of the Committee for Libyan Stock Exchange Market and the Director of the London Stock Exchange.

The agreement provides for training teams from the Libyan Stock Exchange in Tripoli and in London to enable them to run the stock market operations. In addition there will be regular reviews of the Libyan regulations and systems, to modernize them from time to time, and for seminars and conferences organized by the London Stock Exchange.

The Libyan Stock Market closed following the eruption of the Libyan Civil War in February 2011. It remained closed until reopening the following year on 15 March 2012.

Organizer
 Head of oversight and Securities Inspection is Dr. Abdel Salam Alkesh.
Head of IT Ahmed Balras-ali

Working Hours

The Libyan Stock Exchange has normal trading sessions from 10:00am – 5:00pm Sunday-Thursday, and holidays are declared by the exchange in advance.

See also 

 List of African stock exchanges

References

External links
 Libyan Foreign Investment Board
 Libyan Foreign Bank
 Bank of Commerce and Development
 Libya stock market
 Stock Alerts Market

Organizations based in Tripoli, Libya
Stock exchanges in Africa
Economy of Libya
2007 establishments in Libya